The Lifan X50 is a Chinese five-door subcompact crossover SUV produced by the Lifan Motors, division of Lifan Group. Positioning below the Lifan X60 compact crossover, it was initially unveiled at the 2013 Guangzhou Auto Show, and it is based on the same platform as the subcompact Lifan 530 sedan, being essentially the lifted hatchback version of the Lifan 530.

Overview 

The Lifan X50 was originally planned to be available to the Chinese market in September 2014, and it is powered by either a 4-cylinder 1.3 L (1794cc) engine producing  or a 1.5 L (1794cc) engine producing .

Finally available to the Chinese auto market in November 2014, the Lifan X50 was priced between 59,800 yuan to 82,800 yuan.

References

External links 
Lifan Motors website

2010s cars
Cars introduced in 2014
Cars of China
Crossover sport utility vehicles
X50
Mini sport utility vehicles